= Theora Stephens =

American hairdresser

Theora Stephens is an American hairdresser widely credited with a 1980 patent for "a more efficient pressing and curling iron." Another source says Stephens “created the pressing/ curling iron in 1983.“
